"This Is Me" is a song by British pop duo Climie Fisher, originally released in August 1986 as their debut single, but did not break the top 100. After the success of "Rise to the Occasion" and "Love Changes (Everything)", it was re-released in May 1988 and charted at number 22 on the UK Singles Chart. The song features backing vocals by Kirsty MacColl. The music video was directed by Dieter Trattmann and shot at the Albert Wharf Studios in London.

Reception 
Reviewing the song for Record Mirror in 1988, Chris Twomey wrote that it "lacks the hooky qualities that made 'Love Changes' an eventual winner. Treading perilously close to Chicago territory here". Richard Lowe for Smash Hits described the song as "an unremarkable "classy" pop single. The tune's all present and correct, there's a dinky little piano bit that runs all the way through it and has a hugely whistleable "hook", and it's bound to be a very big hit. It's not very exciting though…".

Track listings 
7": 

 "This Is Me" – 3:46
 "Far Across the Water" – 4:15

12": (UK, 1986)

 "This Is Me" (Extended) – 6:25
 "This Is Me" (7" Version) – 3:46
 "Far Across the Water" – 4:15

12": (UK and Europe, 1986)

 "This Is Me" – 8:56
 "This Is Me" – 3:46
 "Far Across the Water" – 4:15

12": (UK and Europe, 1988)

 "This Is Me" ('This Is It' Mix) – 7:38
 "This Is Me" – 3:48
 "Far Across the Water" – 4:28

CD: (UK 1988)

 "This Is Me" (7" Version)
 "Far Across the Water"
 "This Is Me" (12" Version)
 "Love Changes (Everything)"

Personnel 

 Simon Climie – vocals
 Rob Fisher – keyboards
 Kirsty MacColl – backing vocals
 Neil Taylor – guitar
 Pino Palladino – bass guitar
 David Palmer – drums
 Luís Jardim – additional percussion

 Alan Douglas – engineer

Charts

References 

1986 songs
1986 singles
1988 singles
Climie Fisher songs
Songs written by Simon Climie
Songs written by Rob Fisher (British musician)
Song recordings produced by Steve Lillywhite
EMI Records singles